Darnell is an unincorporated community in Champaign County, in the U.S. state of Ohio.

History
Darnell was laid out in 1893 by one Mr. Darnell, and named for him. A post office called Darnell was established in 1899, and discontinued in 1901.

References

Unincorporated communities in Champaign County, Ohio
Unincorporated communities in Ohio